Sybrida is a genus of snout moths.

Species
Sybrida amethystalis Ghesquière, 1942
Sybrida angulata Ghesquière, 1942
Sybrida atroviolacea Ghesquière, 1942
Sybrida dipenthes Meyrick, 1934
Sybrida fulva Ghesquière, 1942
Sybrida inordinata Walker, 1865
Sybrida latericia Ghesquière, 1942
Sybrida misakiensis Shibuya, 1928
Sybrida ragonotalis Snellen, 1892
Sybrida rhodinalis Hampson, 1906
Sybrida roccelina Ghesquière, 1942
Sybrida roseolurida Ghesquière, 1942
Sybrida subviolacea Ghesquière, 1942

Former species
Sybrida approximans (Leech, 1888) is mostly placed in the genus Sacada
Sybrida discinota (Moore, 1866) is mostly placed in the genus Sacada

References

Pyralinae
Pyralidae genera